The Mount Zion African Methodist Episcopal Zion Church, also known as the Mount Zion AME Zion Church Memorial Annex, is a historic church in Montgomery, Alabama, United States.  Located on 467 Holt Street, it was built in 1899 and extensively remodeled in 1921.  

In 1955 the Montgomery Improvement Association, who organized the Montgomery bus boycott, was formed in the building.  During the Selma to Montgomery marches in 1965, marchers rested at the church on their way to the Capitol.  It is included on the Selma to Montgomery National Historic Trail.  The congregation moved to a new location in 1990, and on November 4, 2002, the building was added to the U.S. National Register of Historic Places.

The sides of the building are decorated with murals depicting Martin Luther King Jr., Rosa Parks, and the Selma to Montgomery marches.

References

External links
 

National Register of Historic Places in Montgomery, Alabama
Churches in Montgomery, Alabama
Neoclassical architecture in Alabama
African Methodist Episcopal Zion churches in Alabama
African-American history in Montgomery, Alabama
Neoclassical church buildings in the United States